Canadian Baptist Theological Seminary and College is a Baptist university-level institution in Cochrane, Alberta, Canada, founded in July 1987. It offers both graduate theological programs and undergraduate programs. CSBS&C is affiliated with the Canadian National Baptist Convention (CNBC).

History 
The seminary was founded in 1987 as Canadian Southern Baptist Seminary and College in Cochrane, Alberta by the Canadian National Baptist Convention. In 1996, an undergraduate college program was established. In 2013, a four-year bachelor's degree program was added. It is accredited by the Province of Alberta, Association of Theological Schools, and Association of Biblical Higher Education. In 2022, the school was renamed Canadian Baptist Theological Seminary and College.

References

External links

Universities and colleges in Alberta
Educational institutions established in 1986
Calgary Region
1986 establishments in Alberta
Baptist seminaries and theological colleges in Canada